The Modular Man is a fictional supervillain appearing in American comic books published by Marvel Comics. He first appeared in Rampaging Hulk #2 (April 1977) and was created by John Warner and Val Mayerik.

Fictional character biography
Stephen Weems was a physicist employed by the Brand Corporation (a subsidiary of Roxxon Energy Corporation) to perform experiments using microwaves to induce molecular dissolution. There was an accident during one of the experiments, and Weems was gravely injured by a burst of microwaves, which caused his molecules to start drifting apart. He quickly designed an exoskeleton for himself that would hold him together, keeping his atoms from drifting apart entirely, although his body itself could only be maintained in an intangible form.

An organization known as The Conspiracy promised to cure Weems of his affliction if he aided them in their plans. They gave Weems the code name "Modular Man" because of his ability take his body apart and put it back together without ill effect.
 
Agents of The Conspiracy mailed parts of Weems' body in several packages to Delenor Hospital, where another agent of the Conspiracy, Killer Shrike, lay in a coma after a fight with Ulysses Bloodstone. Members of the Conspiracy reassembled Weems in the hospital's mail room.

Weems kidnapped Killer Shrike and brought him to his masters in the Conspiracy. Unfortunately, the Conspiracy's leadership had shortly before been all killed while attempting to acquire the Hellfire Helix. Weems managed to make Killer Shrike conscious again, but could not cure the latter's amnesia. Killer Shrike promised to help Weems if he would reveal the Shrike's past to him. The two stole scientific equipment from labs at Empire State University, and came into conflict with Spider-Man and Beast.
 
Weems and Killer Shrike took a helicopter to the antenna of the Empire State Building prior to a new television broadcast that would presumably provide the necessary microwaves for Weems to restore himself. The broadcast initially caused Weems great pain, but then, instead of curing him, caused him to increase in size and power. He revealed that his true intent had never been to be cured, but to transform himself into a creature made out of pure energy wielding "power beyond that which any man has ever known." He struck Killer Shrike unconscious, as he no longer needed him. Spider-Man and Beast showed up again and used the Shrike's energy gauntlets to overload Weems' exoskeleton, without the protection of which, his molecules spread out further and further until he just dissolved into thin air.

Powers and abilities
The Modular Man possesses immense strength and durability, as well as the ability to reconfigure his own body in any way he wishes. He could absorb microwave radiation to vastly grow in size, but cannot survive without his exoskeleton. Weems carries numerous, but detachable weapons at his disposal, such as a gas gun and others that are unrevealed.

References

Comics characters introduced in 1977
Fictional characters who can change size
Fictional characters with superhuman durability or invulnerability
Marvel Comics characters with superhuman strength
Marvel Comics mutates
Marvel Comics supervillains